Bodied is a 2017 American battle rap comedy-drama film directed by Joseph Kahn. It was written by Alex Larsen and produced by Eminem, his manager Paul Rosenberg, and Adi Shankar. The film first premiered at the 2017 Toronto International Film Festival. The film stars Calum Worthy as Adam, a graduate student who becomes a competitive battle rapper after becoming immersed in the scene while working on his graduate thesis on the subject.

At the Toronto International Film Festival, the film won the Toronto International Film Festival People's Choice Award: Midnight Madness. It also won Fantastic Fest's 2017 Audience Award. In January 2018, YouTube Red announced it had acquired exclusive streaming rights, with a limited theatrical release beginning on November 2, 2018.

Plot
Adam Merkin, a white graduate student at Berkeley, is writing a thesis on the use of the word "nigga" in battle rap. To research, he attends a freestyle rap battle between rappers X-Tract and Behn Grym and brings his girlfriend Maya along; Maya is offended by the sexism she perceives in the bars used in the battle. Adam attempts to interview Grym and is made fun of for his rhetoric. In the parking lot outside the event, Grym is called out by young white rapper Billy Pistolz, but Adam steps in and delivers a freestyle verse accusing Pistolz of cultural appropriation. An impressed Grym agrees to speak with Adam further.

Adam's father, Professor Merkin, is a best-selling author and professor at Berkeley. When Adam runs the idea of his thesis by his father, he is met with more ridicule. Adam accepts an offer by battle promoter Donnie Narco for a battle for newcomers against Korean rapper Prospek. At the battle, Adam attempts to perform joke lines but doesn't get the reaction he hoped for; he falls back on Asian jokes, winning over the crowd and taking the battle. Adam also meets rappers Che Corleone, Devine Wright, and Megaton, who is known for his aggressive persona.

At a vegan restaurant, Adam attempts to convince the disapproving Maya that it's okay for him to keep battling but insults both her and a waitress in rhyme, angering her and getting himself ejected from the restaurant. Maya later leaves Adam after his rapper friends offend her. After an event where Adam, Che, Devine, and Grym all win their battles, they attend a house party hosted by Megaton where Che has sex with Megaton's girlfriend, porn star Bella Backwoods. An enraged Megaton challenges Che to a battle in the coming days.

Adam tries to stay with Grym, who reveals his life outside battle rapping: he is a video game designer with a wife and a child with cystic fibrosis. He states that he maintains his privacy because he doesn't want people to use personal insults against him and, as such, never uses personal insults himself. Grym offers Adam to stay at his house, but his wife accuses Adam for appropriating black culture and refuses to let him stay.

Adam is contacted by another promoter, offering him the chance to battle Grym for $5,000 at the same event as Megaton and Che's battle, but he turns it down, stating that battle rap has ruined his life. Maya then uses an online video of Adam's battle with Prospek as supporting material for her own thesis, turning the student body of Berkeley against him. His father also disowns him, and the dean of the school suspends his scholarship. Left with no other choice, Adam calls the promoter and accepts the battle.

At the event, Adam and Grym go head to head. Grym delivers scathing but fictional bars against Adam, but Adam betrays his friend to win by using Grym's actual personal details against him, with emphasis on his daughter's illness. While enraged during the fight, Adam gets angry at two other rappers who are talking during the fight, and he and Grym perform an impromptu tag-team battle against them.

Afterwards, Grym informs Adam that they are no longer friends, because while other battle rappers' cruelty is merely an act, Adam's battle rapping has become an outlet for his actual cruelty. Grym departs, saying he needs to be where he belongs; with his family. Desperate, Adam attempts to call Maya and ask her to marry him, but she lashes out at the ridiculousness of the idea and tells him to stay away from her.

Megaton "bodies" Che during their battle, even bringing his girlfriend out to freestyle about how bad he is at sex. Afterwards, Megaton starts insulting the crowd, daring anyone to challenge him. Adam, left with nothing else, steps into the ring and takes on Megaton, who hits him in the face and knocks out a tooth during his verse. Unfazed, the bloodied Adam gets back on his feet and calls Megaton out for putting on an aggressive act. Megaton concedes the battle to a triumphant Adam. Afterwards, Adam, now sleeping on a park bench on the Berkeley campus, watches a video of his new widespread fame on his phone and says he's decided what his rap name is, but the film cuts to credits before he can say. The song "My Name Is" plays during the credits, heavily implying that Adam metaphorically represents Eminem's alter ego Slim Shady.

Cast
 Calum Worthy as Adam Merkin, a progressive graduate student who develops a passion for battle rapping while researching the scene for his thesis paper
 Jackie Long as Behn Grym, a veteran battle rapper, and Adam's mentor in navigating the world of battle rapping 
 Rory Uphold as Maya, Adam's girlfriend 
 Dumbfoundead as Prospek, a Korean-American battle rapper, and one of Adam's first opponents
 Walter Perez as Che Corleone
 Shoniqua Shandai as Devine Wright 
 Charlamagne tha God as Hunnid Gramz, a battle rap promoter
 Dizaster as Megaton, a battle rapper with a loud, aggressive, and in-your-face battling style, and the movie's antagonist
 Loaded Lux as Bluntz
 Hollow da Don as 40 MAG
 Debra Wilson as Dean Hampton
 Anthony Michael Hall as Professor Merkin, Adam's father, a professor at the college Adam attends
 Daniel Rashid as MC Goggles
 Simon Rex as Donnie Narco, a battle rap promoter & host with an outlandish personality. According to Ultimate Rap League promoter Street Star Norbes, Rex's character is modeled after real-life battle rap promoter/host Nick "Lush One" Hyams.
 Corey Charron as Billy Pistolz
 Terrance "Big T" Greenlee as X-Tract
 Davone "Daylyt" Campbell as Big Zee
 Candice Renee as Jas
 Tony "Madness" Gomez as Choke Artist
 Rone as Groom
 Pat Stay as Racist Battler
 Conceited as Comedian
 Vivian Lamolli as Bella Backwoods
 Lisa Maley as Becky
 Eddie Perino as Jon
 Eric Allen Smith as Robert
 Adi Shankar as Campus Security Guard With Turban
 Andy Milonakis as Freddie Hustle
 Faithe Herman as Grace

The film also includes cameo appearances by real-life battle rap personalities The Saurus, Illmaculate, Nocando, Arsonal, Philly Swain, Head ICE, JayGoesOff ((Joseph Geist)), Iron Solomon, Lush One, Poison Pen, Ultimate Rap League founder Troy "Smack White" Mitchell, Norbes, King of the Dot founder Organik, Aktive, Dre Vishiss, poker player Daniel Negreanu, and actors Yoshio Iizuka, Sloane Avery and Becky Wu.

Reception
On review aggregator Rotten Tomatoes, the film holds an approval rating of 89% based on 82 reviews. The website's critical consensus states, "With its thorny themes and aggressive humor, Bodied dares to offend - and justifies its approach with a subversive comedy that edifies as it entertains." On Metacritic, the film has a weighted average score of 75 out of 100, based on 22 critics, indicating "generally favorable reviews".

Brian Tallerico, writing for RogerEbert.com, said that the film "offers an entertaining window into a culture that most people probably know very little about, but it's also a clever take on a generation more aware of what's offensive and what's not than any before". Barry Hertz of The Globe and Mail called the film "an outrageous and outrageously entertaining treatise on cultural sensitivity".

Home media
Bodied was released for DVD and Blu-ray on September 17, 2019 through Gravitas Ventures.

See also 
 List of hood films

References

External links
 

2017 films
2010s musical comedy-drama films
American musical comedy-drama films
2010s hip hop films
Films directed by Joseph Kahn
Eminem
Neon (distributor) films
Films set in the San Francisco Bay Area
2010s English-language films
2010s American films